Sunbury may refer to:

Australia
Sunbury, Victoria
Sunbury Downs College
Sunbury Pop Festival (1972-1975)
Sunbury wine region

Barbados 
Sunbury, Barbados

Canada
Sunbury County, New Brunswick
Sunbury County, Nova Scotia (1765-1784), ceased to exist when the province of New Brunswick was created
Sunbury, Ontario, a community within South Frontenac Township

United Kingdom
Sunbury-on-Thames, Surrey, England

United States
Sunbury, Georgia
Sunbury Township, Livingston County, Illinois
Sunbury, Iowa
Sunbury, North Carolina, an unincorporated community in Gates County
Sunbury, Ohio, a village in Delaware County
Sunbury, Pennsylvania, a city in Northumberland County
Bangor, Maine, a city in Penobscot County; its proposed name was Sunbury at the time of its incorporation

See also
Sudbury (disambiguation)